The 1973 Thomas Cup was the ninth edition of the Thomas Cup, the world championship of men's international team badminton (its female counterpart is the Uber Cup). The final set of ties (team matches) involving regional zone winners and the defending champion nation were held in Jakarta, Indonesia in late May and early June 1973. Beginning in 1948–49 the tournament was held every three years until 1982 and has been held every two years thereafter. For more details on the format of Thomas Cup competition see Wikipedia's general article on the Thomas Cup.

Indonesia won its fifth title after beating Denmark in the Final Round.

Teams
23 teams from 4 regions took part in the competition. As defending champion, Indonesia skipped the qualifications and the first round of inter-zone competition, and played directly in the second round (effectively, the semifinals of the tournament).

Australasian zone

Asian zone

European zone

Panamerican zone

Qualification (Intra-zone) summary

Early ties (team matches) in the 1972–1973 Thomas Cup series were marked by an unusual number of close contests; the winners of several of these were not determined until the final match. One such instance occurred in the Australasian zone final between India and New Zealand. Here Asif Parpia and seventeen-year-old prodigy Prakash Padukone edged their doubles opponents 15–12 in the third game to put India into the inter-zone playoffs for the first time since 1955. In the Pan American zone a young Mexican team parlayed wins by their top two singles players, Roy Diaz Gonzalez and Victor Jaramillo Luque, with an upset win in doubles to defeat the USA 5–4. It thus overcame an estimable effort from 41-year-old Jim Poole who won all three of his matches, including his final Thomas Cup appearance in singles. In the zone final, however, Mexico was beaten 6–3 by a well seasoned Canadian team which included ex-Thai stars Channarong Ratanaseangsuang and Raphi Kanchanaraphi, both in their mid thirties.

In the European zone England was upset 4–5 by a solid West German squad which featured a world class singles player in Wolfgang Bochow who won both of his matches, as well as a world class doubles team in Roland Maywald and Willi Braun who won the last match of the tie to clinch the victory. Elsewhere in Europe a Scottish team that included Bob McCoig playing in his sixth Thomas Cup series gave Sweden unexpected difficulty but succumbed 4–5. The tendency toward close contests, however, did not extend to perennial European power Denmark which beat West Germany 7–2 and Sweden 8–1 respectively in the zone semifinal and final. Young Flemming Delfs made his Thomas Cup debut in these ties by handily winning his three singles matches.

The greatest drama at the highest level of play in the qualifying ties, came in two Asian zone battles, both involving traditional power Malaysia. In the first of these Malaysia and Japan alternated tight victories in perhaps the longest and closest tie in Thomas Cup history. Malaysia won the last doubles match in three games to advance to the zone final, but Punch Gunalan's 17–16 third game win over Japan's Junji Honma on the second night of play shows how narrow was the difference between victory and defeat. If Malaysia had snatched victory from the jaws of defeat against Japan, however, it proceeded to snatch defeat from the jaws of victory against its next opponent, Thailand. Up three matches to none, Malaysia's undoing began when Tan Aik Huang, who had played an earlier singles, suffered a cramp and was carried off the doubles court to end the first night's play at 3–1. Though Aik Huang played the next day he lost both of his matches, and Gunalan's win at third singles was offset by Tan Aik Mong's singles loss. In the final and decisive match Gunalan and the veteran Ng Boon Bee, the world's top doubles team just two seasons earlier, seemed unnerved and were routed by veteran Sangob Rattanusorn and young star Bandid Jaiyen. The two Thais had also played singles and emerged as the heroes of an upset victory. Conversely, it was a sad Thomas Cup exit for three of Malaysia's "greats," Ng Boon Bee, Tan Aik Huang, and Punch Gunalan.

Inter-zone playoffs

First & Second round summary
The first tie of the inter-zone playoffs in Jakarta pitting Canada against India was another rousing 5–4 battle featuring numerous close matches. A few days shy of his eighteenth birthday, India's Prakash Padukone showed signs of future greatness by defeating both Jamie Paulson (climbing back from 6-14 down in the third) and Bruce Rollick in titanic three game struggles. Paulson, however, won his remaining singles and both of his doubles with the ebullient Yves Pare. Ex-Thais Raphi Kanchanaraphi and Channarong Ratanaseangsuang completed a sweep of the doubles allowing Canada to advance to the semifinal against Denmark.

Unfortunately for spectators, the Canada vs. India tie was the last of the dramatic, issue-always-in-doubt team contests which had characterized much of the 72-73 Thomas Cup series. Canada, which needed to be at its best to be competitive against a typically talented Danish lineup, was flat instead and lost tamely  0–9. Svend Pri, playing both singles and doubles, won all of his matches in straight games. Kanchanaraphi and Ratanaseangsuang, each of whom had winning Thomas Cup records against the Danes in matches dating back to 1961 and 1964, found the going rougher in their mid thirties. Dropping only two games in the tie, Denmark advanced to the Thomas Cup final for the fourth time.

In the other semifinal Thailand, an upset winner of the Asian zone qualifier, fought hard but was out-gunned by an Indonesian team that was perhaps the best yet in their then almost unbroken string of Thomas Cup success. Thailand's diminutive but highly talented Bandid Jaiyen wore down the veteran Muljadi in three games, but the Thais were unable to capture another match. Traditionally strong in doubles, the Thais dropped eight straight doubles games, only one of them close, to Indonesian pairs containing future "legends" Tjun Tjun, Christian Hadinata, and Ade Chandra. With Rudy Hartono winning all four of his matches for the fifth consecutive time, Indonesia advanced to play in its sixth straight final.

First round

Second round

Final round summary
Muljadi for Indonesia and Henning Borch for Denmark were the only holdovers from the controversial 1964 final between the two nations (they had faced each other at third singles with Muljadi, then known as Ang Tjin Siang, winning). Both ended their Thomas Cup careers with this '73 final. It was a happy ending for Muljadi who outlasted Elo Hansen in three hard games in the first match of the tie, and then beat a jaded Svend Pri in straight games on the second night (thus completing a perfect 6–0 singles record in the championship rounds of Thomas Cup). Pri was jaded on the second night largely because of his colossal effort on the first night in handing Rudy Hartono his first Thomas Cup singles loss. Smashing accurately in the first and third games and staving off several match points Pri threw his racket to the crowd at the conclusion of the battle. Sterling achievement though it was, it did little to spark a good Danish team against a generally better opponent on the opponent's home court. Hansen became ill and defaulted his second night's match to Hartono. Budding Danish star Flemming Delfs faded after the first game to lose the third singles match to Amril Nurman 4-15 in the third. The doubles matches were less competitive. 1970 All-England champions Tom Bacher and Poul Petersen, never at their best in the tropics, lost tamely to Christian and Chandra and to Hartono and Tjun Tjun. As for Henning Borch, the only Dane at that time to have competed in five inter-zone campaigns, it was a final disappointment. He and Svend Pri failed to score more than eight points in any of their doubles games. Indonesia won the tie 8–1, and with it their fifth Thomas Cup title.

Final round

References

External links
 tangkis.tripod.com
 Mike's Badminton Populorum 

Thomas Cup
Thomas & Uber Cup
Thomas Cup